Carlos Ernesto Castro (born 24 September 1978) is a retired Ecuadorian international defender.

Club career
Castro played his final season for Club Deportivo Quevedo in the Campeonato Ecuatoriano de Fútbol.

External links

1978 births
Living people
Footballers from Quito
Ecuadorian footballers
Ecuador international footballers
S.D. Aucas footballers
C.D. El Nacional footballers
Barcelona S.C. footballers
C.D. Cuenca footballers
C.D. Quevedo footballers
Association football defenders